The following are the national records in athletics in Georgia maintained by the Athletic Federation of Georgia.

Outdoor

Key to tables:

h = hand timing

A = affected by altitude

Men

Women

Indoor

Men

Women

Notes

References
General
Georgian Outdoor Records 15 July 2019 updated
Georgian Indoor Records 16 February 2019 updated
Specific

External links
GAF web site 

Georgia
Records
Athletics
Athletics